In information theory, the conditional entropy quantifies the amount of information needed to describe the outcome of a random variable  given that the value of another random variable  is known. Here, information is measured in shannons, nats, or hartleys.

Definition 
The conditional entropy of  given  is defined as

Note: Here, the convention is that the expression  should be treated as being equal to zero. This is because . 

This quantity is directly related to the amount of information needed to describe the event  given .

Motivation 
Let  be the entropy of the discrete random variable  conditioned on the discrete random variable  taking a certain value . Let  have probability mass function .

where  is the information content of the outcome of  taking the value . The entropy of  conditioned on  taking the value  is defined analogously by conditional expectation: 

Note that  is the result of averaging  over all possible values  that  may take. Also, if the above sum is taken over a sample , the expected value  is known in some domains as equivocation.

Properties

Conditional entropy equals zero

Conditional entropy of independent random variables

Chain rule
Assume that the combined system determined by two random variables  and  has joint entropy , that is, we need  bits of information on average to describe its exact state. Once  is known, we only need  bits to describe the state of the whole system. This quantity is exactly , which gives the chain rule of conditional entropy:

The chain rule follows from the above definition of conditional entropy:

In general, a chain rule for multiple random variables holds:

It has a similar form to chain rule in probability theory, except that addition instead of multiplication is used.

Bayes' rule
Bayes' rule for conditional entropy states

Symmetry entails . Subtracting the two equations implies Bayes' rule.

If  is conditionally independent of  given  we have:

Other properties
For any  and :

For independent  and :

 and 

Conditional differential entropy

Definition 
The above definition is for discrete random variables. The continuous version of discrete conditional entropy is called conditional differential (or continuous) entropy. Let  and  be a continuous random variables with a joint probability density function . The differential conditional entropy  is defined as

Properties 
In contrast to the conditional entropy for discrete random variables, the conditional differential entropy may be negative.

As in the discrete case there is a chain rule for differential entropy:

Notice however that this rule may not be true if the involved differential entropies do not exist or are infinite.

Joint differential entropy is also used in the definition of the mutual information between continuous random variables:

Relation to estimator error
The conditional differential entropy yields a lower bound on the expected squared error of an estimator. For any random variable , observation  and estimator  the following holds:

This is related to the uncertainty principle from quantum mechanics.

Generalization to quantum theory
In quantum information theory, the conditional entropy is generalized to the conditional quantum entropy. The latter can take negative values, unlike its classical counterpart.

See also 
 Entropy (information theory)
 Mutual information
 Conditional quantum entropy
 Variation of information
 Entropy power inequality
 Likelihood function

References

Entropy and information
Information theory